Landen may refer to:

Places
Landen, a municipality in Belgium
Landen, Ohio, a centre of population in the United States

People
Bill Landen (born 1956), member of the Wyoming Senate
Dinsdale Landen (1932–2003), British television actor
John Landen (1719–1790), English mathematician
Ludwig Landen (1908–1985), German Olympic canoer
Steve Landen (1952–2017), American bridge player

See also
London (disambiguation)